"If You Think You're Lonely Now" is a song recorded and released by American soul singer-songwriter Bobby Womack in 1981 from his album The Poet. It was initially released as the b-side to his song "Secrets" but proved to be the more popular track. The single reached number three for four weeks on the Hot Soul Singles chart. This is significant because Womack released the song during a time when R&B was on a down slope and the charts were largely dominated by dance music.

Charts

K-Ci Hailey version
The song was later revised in 1994 by K-Ci Hailey, which is featured on the soundtrack to the film, Jason's Lyric. K-Ci's version was a pop hit, which peaked to number seventeen on Billboard's Hot 100 and eleven on Hot R&B Singles charts. The song's main hook is also invoked by Mariah Carey in her 2005 song "We Belong Together".

References

1982 singles
Bobby Womack songs
1994 singles
Songs written by Bobby Womack
Songs written by Sandra Sully (songwriter)
Songs written by Patrick Moten
Song recordings produced by Bobby Womack
1981 songs